The Ballot Initiative Strategy Center (BISC) is a liberal American advocacy organization which tries to motivate voters to go to the polls through the strategic deployment of liberal-oriented ballot initiatives.  The group provides legal advice and political expertise for left-leaning ballot measure campaigns.

Organization
BISC was founded in 1999. In 2007, BISC moved into an office on K Street.

Focus
In 2016, the group's executive director said it was focusing on issues related to economic fairness, such as minimum wage measures. Targeted states and campaigns were not specified.

Funding
BISC does not publicly disclose its donors. The group has received financial support from billionaire George Soros and his Open Society Institute, NARAL Pro-Choice America, the Ford Foundation, and the National Education Association. BISC is a member of America Votes, a 501(c)(4) organization that aims "to coordinate and promote progressive issues."

References

Further reading

External links
Ballotpedia profile

Progressive organizations in the United States
501(c)(4) nonprofit organizations
Political advocacy groups in the United States
Ballot measures in the United States